Frans Van Leemputten or Frans van Leemputten (29 December 1850 – 26 November 1914) was a Belgian Realist painter who specialized in landscape paintings of the Campine and Brabantine regions in Belgium as well as scenes with villagers and animals.

Life
Van Leemputten was born in Werchter as the son of Jan Frans Van Leemputten and Maria Catharina Van Cleynenbreugel.  His father was originally a farmer but moved to Brussels in 1852 to become a painting restorer as he had an interest and some practice in art.  Frans and his older brother Cornelius were encouraged by their father to practise art.  In 1855 the family briefly moved to Antwerp where the young Frans attended classes at the Antwerp Academy.  In 1858 the family moved back to Brussels where Frans worked mainly in his father's restoration shop.

Van Leemputten took evening classes at the Academy of Fine Arts of Brussels from 1865 to 1873.  Here he was a student of Paul Lauters.  Lauters encouraged Van Leemputten to paint from nature rather than to copy old compositions.  Under the influence of Constantin Meunier and the Dutch landscape painter Paul Gabriël who was then living in Brussels and the reading of Hendrik Conscience's novels which extolled the virtues of the peasants of the Campine, Van Leemputten started to devote himself almost exclusively to the depiction of that region and its inhabitants.  He became a member of the drawing club 'La Patte de Dindon'.

In 1872 Van Leemputten made his debut at the salon of La Chrysalide, the group to which also James Ensor, Louis Artan and Guillaume Vogels belonged.  He also joined 'L'Essor', a group which mainly promoted realism and assisted its members financially and with the organization of exhibitions and the purchase of materials.  Through his membership of these two groups Van Leemputten was closely linked to some of the most progressive Belgian artists of his day. From 1874 he submitted works to the Antwerp salon.

Van Leemputten was in 1892 appointed professor of the painting of animals at the Higher Institute of Fine Arts of the Antwerp Academy.  He replaced Charles Verlat in that position.

Van Leemputten's pupils included Frans Mortelmans, Frans Slager, Jan Van Puyenbroeck, Achille Van Sassenbrouck and Hendrik Jan Wolter.

Van Leemputten died on 26 November 1914 in Antwerp.

Work
Van Leemputten painted realist landscapes with figures, village scenes and animal scenes. He initially employed a dull palette but gradually started using brighter tones. Van Leemputten worked in oils as well as in watercolors.  His work was influenced by the realism of Jean-François Millet.

Van Leemputten was part of a group of Belgian painters who took refuge from the complexity of urban life to look for simplicity, purity and naturalness in the pre-industrial countryside.  They saw the countryside as a serene world, which stood in sharp contrast to their familiar urban environment.  In the countryside they searched for quiet and contemplation and identified themselves with the simple villagers.  They had a particular fondness for the Campine region, which was relatively isolated and had been untouched by industrialization.  Some of these artists, such as Theodoor Verstraete and Van Leemputten who both worked in the Campine, depicted the rural reality from their own urban background and viewpoint.  Theodoor Verstraete was driven by his social consciousness and compassion with the villagers.  Van Leemputten, on the other hand, concentrated on sharp observations of the daily life of the peasants, their customs and key life events.  In his works he emphasized the dignity of the poor farmers, their mutual connectedness and profound devoutness.  This is shown in works such as Distribution of bread in the village (1892, M - Museum Leuven).  

His compositions are characterized by a clear palette and are executed with photographic precision. Van Leemputten often represented the Campine residents as monumental, immobile figures.  Some of his works were thus transformed into still images of the serene country life.  Thanks to their precise and objective observation, his works have documentary value.

References

External links

Belgian genre painters
Belgian history painters
Belgian landscape painters
 19th-century Belgian painters
19th-century Belgian male artists
1850 births
1914 deaths